Frankel City is an unincorporated community in Andrews County, located in the U.S. state of Texas. It is located within the Andrews, Texas micropolitan area.

History
Frankel City was started by Andrews County's oil boom. It was first called Fullerton when it was first established in 1941, and the Fullerton Oil Company drilled a discovery well in the area. More wells were drilled in the community during World War II, and there was a total of 100 oil rigs successfully drilling in the county in a -by- area four years later in 1945. There were oilfield supply stores opened by several companies, and they built camps on the area's sand hills for the families of about 750 workers, including the workers. A post office was established at Fullerton in 1948, and G.W. Blanchard became postmaster. It was then renamed Frankel City in honor of the Frankel Brothers Oil Company. The community's first and only mayor was named Skeet Morris. Even though oil drilling was successful in the community, it, unfortunately, began to decline, and the post office remained in operation until March 12, 1976. Frankel City had several stores and filling stations, two cafes, two churches, and telephone exchange at one time. It consisted of a café, only one house, a mobile home, and an estimated 11 inhabitants by the 1980s.

Geography
Frankel City sits at the juncture of Farm to Market Roads 181 and 1967, approximately 15 miles west of Andrews in the western portion of Andrews County.

Education
In 1945, students in the community rode to school by bus, since the nearby city of Andrews had the county's only school at that time. The community continues to be served by the Andrews Independent School District to this day since all of Andrews County is also one whole school district.

References

Unincorporated communities in Andrews County, Texas
Unincorporated communities in Texas